Exis may refer to:

Exis Interactive, a game studio
Exis, music producer
Exi (subculture), a youth movement in Hamburg, Germany, in the 1950s
The Exies, a band named after the movement (more specifically, from a quote in a John Lennon book that mentioned the movement)
Exis, the debut EP of Drake's new OVO Sound labelmate, Roy Woods

See also 
 Exi (disambiguation)